Bolibar is a village in Álava, Basque Country, Spain.

References

Populated places in Álava